Pachyrhynchus smaragdinus  is a species of primitive weevil in the family Curculionidae.

Description 
Pachyrhynchus smaragdinus is black, with a regular pattern of pale green spots.

Distribution 
This species can be found in Philippines, Leyte island.

References 

 Barry.fotopage.ru
 Online Resource on Philippine Beetles

Brentidae
Beetles described in 1871
Insects of the Philippines